Christopher Steel (1938–1991) was a British composer.

Christopher Steel or Steele may also refer to:

 Sir Christopher Steel (diplomat) (1903–1973), British diplomat
 Christopher Steele (born 1964), former British intelligence officer
 Christopher Steele (artist) (1733-1767), English artist

See also
 Chris Steel
 Chris Steele (disambiguation)